"Hinky Dinky Parlay Voo?" is a song composed by Al Dubin, Irving Mills, Jimmy McHugh and Irwin Dash in 1924 and published by Jack Mills, Inc. It is a  sequel to the popular World War I song, "Mademoiselle from Armentières," having the same refrain.

Successful recordings of the song were made by Ernest Hare and Billy Jones for Columbia Records; and by Billy Murray and Ed Smalle for Victor Records.

The sheet music can be found at the Pritzker Military Museum & Library.

References

Bibliography
Crew, Danny O. Presidential Sheet Music: An Illustrated Catalogue of Published Music Associated with the American Presidency and Those Who Sought the Office. Jefferson, North Carolina: McFarland, 2001.  
Furia, Philip. The Poets of Tin Pan Alley: A History of America’s Great Lyricists. New York: Oxford University Press, 1990.  
Jasen, David A. Tin Pan Alley: The Composers, the Songs, the Performers, and Their Times : the Golden Age of American Popular Music from 1886 to 1956. New York: D.I. Fine, 1988. . 
Parker, Bernard S. World War I Sheet Music: 9,670 Patriotic Songs Published in the United States, 1914-1920, with More Than 600 Covers Illustrated. Jefferson, N.C.: McFarland, 2007.  
 Vogel, Frederick G. World War I Songs: A History and Dictionary of Popular American Patriotic Tunes, with Over 300 Complete Lyrics. Jefferson, N.C: McFarland & Co, 1995. Print.  

1924 songs
Songs of World War I
March music